A Cisco Certified Network Professional (CCNP) is a person in the IT industry who has achieved the professional level of Cisco Career Certification.

Professional certifications 
Prior to February 2020 there were approximately eight professional-level certification programs within Cisco Career Certifications.

 CCDP
 CCNP Cloud
 CCNP Collaboration
 CCNP Data Center
 CCNP Routing and Switching
 CCNP Security
 CCNP Service Provider
 CCNP Wireless

Cisco has announced that as of February 2020, the above format has been retired and replaced with the following:

    CCNP Enterprise (integrating CCNP Routing and Switching, CCDP and CCNP Wireless)
    CCNP Data Center (integrating CCNP Cloud)
    CCNP Security
    CCNP Service Provider
    CCNP Collaboration
    Cisco Certified DevNet Professional

Migration guides to the newer certification exams are available from Cisco at its CCNP Migration Tools page.

Required exams
Starting February 2020, no entry-level certification will be required to attempt the CCNP exams.

Relevant entry-level certifications need to be passed in advance, if someone wants to attempt the Professionals level exams. 
 The associate-level certification programs are: CCDA, CCNA Cloud, CCNA Collaboration, CCNA Cyber Ops, CCNA Data Center, CCNA Industrial, CCNA Routing and Switching, CCNA Security, CCNA Service Provider and CCNA Wireless.
 Each area of expertise requires passing the relevant exams for certification with a professional understanding and capability of networking.
 For example, the CCNP Routing and Switching consists of three exams: Implementing IP Routing (ROUTE), Implementing IP Switched Networks (SWITCH) and Troubleshooting and Maintaining IP Networks (TSHOOT).

Validity
The validity of CCNP Certification is 3 years. Renewal requires certification holders to register for and pass same or higher level Cisco recertification exam(s) every 3 years.

Related certifications
 Associate-level certification: CCNA
 Expert-level Certification: CCIE

References

CCNP Training From PyNetLabs

CCNP Training with Network Kings

Cisco Systems
Information technology qualifications